Jesse Louis Cox (born May 18, 1981) is an American YouTube gaming personality, comedian, voice actor, and media commentator. He is the owner of the YouTube channel previously named OMFGcata, a gaming channel on which Cox posts most of his content. As of February 2023, the channel has over 995,000 subscribers.

Biography

Jesse Cox was born in Wheeling, West Virginia and for the early part of his life traveled frequently with his parents around the country. Eventually, they settled in Oakwood, Ohio just outside of Dayton. After high school, he studied at the State University of New York at Buffalo where he double majored in Theater and History, earning a bachelor's degree. He later went on to receive his master's degree in education while teaching, from the University of Dayton.

Content

YouTube
OMFGcata is Cox's YouTube channel (Rebranded as "Jesse Cox") and serves as his primary content platform. The name of the channel was inspired by the Cataclysm expansion of World of Warcraft, the coverage of which was one of Cox's first major video series. After the initial release of Cataclysm, Jesse expanded his coverage into "Let's Play" style gaming videos and eventually into a weekly "show" format featuring friends and colleagues. In 2016, he won a Golden Joystick Award for upcoming YouTube personality. The gaming convention Coxcon is named after Cox.

In 2016, it was announced that Cox and Michele Morrow were co-creating in a YouTube Red series, Good Game, about a fledgling eSports team starring Cox. It aired in 2017, and was generally praised by critics, but was cancelled in 2018 after one season due to low viewership. Cox was signed to Creative Artists Agency in 2020.

Voice acting
Cox has voiced several video game characters such as Spriticus in Heroes of Newerth, Genji in Awesomenauts, and an ice troll named Jesse in The Witcher 3: Wild Hunt, as well as a quest-giving character in Cyberpunk 2077, named Jesse Johnson.

Podcasts
Cox co-hosted the Co-Optional Podcast alongside his friends Brooke "Dodger" Thorne and John "TotalBiscuit" Bain (prior to his death in 2018). After Bain's death, the podcast was hosted by his wife, Genna Bain. The last episode of the podcast, Episode 257, aired on Genna Bain's Youtube channel in October 2019. The gaming Podcast was hosted every week, usually with a fourth special guest or occasionally their friend Eric "Crendor" Hraab. While the podcast's main focus was about video games, they commonly derail and discuss other topics of the day, giving way to the joke "We do occasionally talk about Video Games".

in November 2012, Cox and Hraab launched the "Cox'n'Crendor Podcast", an initially daily, and later weekly, series that serves as a parody of a daily news show. Cox and Hraab discuss one another's personal and professional lives, poke fun at entertaining news stories, and do humorous reports on traffic, sports, and weather, the latter of which utilizes the hometowns of viewers. As of August 2022, the Cox'n'Crendor Podcast Youtube channel has more than 76,000 subscribers.

CoxCon
CoxCon was a video game and content creator convention, hosted by Cox and held annually in Telford, United Kingdom from 2015 to 2019. The convention featured game exhibitors, vendors, board gaming, and most prominently internet celebrity guests in various panels over the course of two days. Most of the artwork featured in Coxcon's promotional material was created by Daniel "Supardanil" Tan, animator of "Cox n' Crendor Animated!".

References

External links
 Jesse Cox 'main' YouTube channel
 Jesse Cox 'alt' YouTube channel for clips, highlights, shorts, and VODs from Jesse Cox streams not featured on the main channel
 Cox 'n' Crendor Animated! YouTube channel, featuring animated non-content from Jesse Cox & Crendor podcast. Created by the infamous @supardanil (Dan Tan)
 Jesse Cox's @JesseCox Twitter
 Jesse Cox Patreon

Nerdist article about Cox's YouTube Red series 
Sundered teases its stylish Metroidvania world ahead of today's closed beta, PC Gamer

1981 births
Living people
American male video game actors
American podcasters
American YouTubers
Esports team owners
Gaming YouTubers
Let's Players
People from Los Angeles
People from Wheeling, West Virginia
Schoolteachers from West Virginia
University at Buffalo alumni
University of Dayton alumni
Video game commentators
People from Oakwood, Montgomery County, Ohio